The WTO General Council, on 26 May 2009, agreed to hold a seventh WTO ministerial conference session in Geneva from 30 November - 3 December 2009. A statement by chairman Amb. Mario Matus acknowledged that the prime purpose was to remedy a breach of protocol requiring two-yearly "regular" meetings, which had lapsed with the Doha Round failure in 2005, and that the "scaled-down" meeting would not be a negotiating session, but "emphasis will be on transparency and open discussion rather than on small group processes and informal negotiating structures". The general theme for discussion is "The WTO, the Multilateral Trading System and the Current Global Economic Environment".

References

World Trade Organization ministerial conferences
2009 in Switzerland
Diplomatic conferences in Switzerland
21st-century diplomatic conferences
2009 in international relations
History of Geneva
21st century in Geneva
November 2009 events in Europe
December 2009 events in Europe